Rennae Stubbs and Helena Suková were the defending champions but they competed with different partners that year, Stubbs with Mary Joe Fernández and Suková with Manon Bollegraf.

Fernández and Stubbs lost in the semifinals to Bollegraf and Suková.

Bollegraf and Suková lost in the final 6–2, 6–4 against Lindsay Davenport and Lisa Raymond.

Seeds
Champion seeds are indicated in bold text while text in italics indicates the round in which those seeds were eliminated.

 Gigi Fernández /  Natasha Zvereva (quarterfinals)
 Manon Bollegraf /  Helena Suková (final)
 Mary Joe Fernández /  Rennae Stubbs (semifinals)
 Jill Hetherington /  Kathy Rinaldi-Stunkel (first round)

Draw

External links
 1994 Evert Cup Doubles Draw

Doubles
1994 Newsweek Champions Cup and the Evert Cup